Máté Balogh (born 9 November 1990 in Győr) is a Hungarian composer and university lecturer at the Franz Liszt Academy of Music, Budapest.

He studied composition at the Liszt Academy with Zoltán Jeney and the Consevatorio di Trieste with Fabio Nieder. He was a mentee of Péter Eötvös. His pieces has been performed all over the world, including Europe, Turkey, Taiwan, China, Japan and the United States. He was awarded the Junior Prima Prize and Artisjus Prize.

He is the composer of Zsófia Szilágyi's film entitled One day, which was awarded the Fipresci Prize at the Cannes Film Festival 2018.

Works (selection) 

 2019: Alabama March  (for symphony orchestra) - dedicated to the bicentennial of State Alabama.
 2019: One Hundred Famous View of Edo (for bass-instruments and 12 gongs) - on the 150th Anniversary of Japanese-Hungarian Diplomatic Relations
 2018: Kipling's Speech (for recitation and chamber group) - commissioned by the Karl-Amadeus-Hartmann Gesellschaft, Munich
 2017: Odes (for traditional chinese orchestra) - commissioned by the Ministry of Culture of the People's Republic of China
 2016: Jam Quartet (for flute, triangles, piano and cello)
 2015: 7 Ant(hem)s (for cello and piano) - Hommage to Péter Esterházy
 2015: Kikaku&Basho (for soprano sax and harp) - on a zen-buddhist koan
 2012: Luca Marenzio in Salzburg (for string orchestra) - awarded by ECSA

References 

1990 births
People from Győr
Hungarian composers
Living people